Idabelle Yeiser (born c. 1900, died 24 September 1954) was an American woman poet, writer, and educator, who was part of the New Negro Movement in Philadelphia.

Early life and education 
Yeiser was the daughter of John G. Yeiser, a pastor in the African Methodist Episcopal Church. She graduated from Asbury Park High School in 1918, and from the New Jersey State Normal School at Montclair in 1920. She earned a bachelor's degree at the University of Pennsylvania, with further studies in Paris and Madrid. In 1940, she earned a doctorate in education at Teachers College, Columbia University.

Career 
Yeiser taught school and private language classes in Camden, New Jersey, and in Philadelphia. She was known for teaching with puppets. She was an education professor at Dillard University from 1943 to 1946, was a professor of education at Cheyney College in 1950, and was an assistant professor of education at Brooklyn College in the 1950s.

In the 1930s, Yeiser was a prize-winning horsewoman in Philadelphia. She was an interviewer with the Mississippi Health Project, working with Melva L. Price and Dorothy Boulding Ferebee, among others.  In 1945, she was a consultant to the Oklahoma City Negro Teachers' Institute. 

Yeiser was active in the peace movement. She was a member of the Philadelphia chapter of the Women's International League for Peace and Freedom, and in the early 1930s had a newspaper column in the Philadelphia Tribune, titled "Peace Corner." In summer 1947, she was one of six American representatives at a UNESCO seminar in France.

Works
 "Echoes of Toulouse, France" (1926, The Crisis)
 Moods: A Book of Verse (1937)
 "The Why and How of Teaching French to Little Children" (1939, The Modern Language Journal)
 The Curriculum as an Integrating Force for Ethnic Variations (1943)
 "The Teacher Beyond the Textbook" (1944, The Southwestern Journal)
 Lyric and Legend (1947)
 "Notes on a UNESCO Conference" (1949)
 "Two Student Teaching Programs" (1953, Journal of Teacher Education)
 "An Essay on Creativity" (1953, Arts and Activities)

Personal life 
Yeiser died in 1954.

References

1890s births
Year of birth uncertain
1954 deaths
Writers from Philadelphia
African-American history in Philadelphia
African-American poets
African-American women writers
American women poets
Asbury Park High School alumni
Harlem Renaissance
Montclair State University alumni
Teachers College, Columbia University alumni
20th-century African-American women
20th-century American people